The Central District of Bakharz County is a district (bakhsh) in Bakharz County, Razavi Khorasan Province, Iran. At the 2006 census, its population was 22,931, in 5,301 families.  The District has one city: Bakharz.  The District has one rural district (dehestan): Bakharz Rural District.

References 

Districts of Razavi Khorasan Province
Bakharz County